The Bulgarian State Football Championship in the 1935 was contested by 13 clubs and was won by Sportklub Sofia. Its format was based on the principle of direct elimination until 1944, when a league format was adopted and the tournament name was changed to the Bulgarian Republic Football Championship.

First round

|-
!colspan="3" style="background-color:#D0F0C0; text-align:left;" |Replay

|}

Quarter-finals

|}
1The match was originally finished 0–1 for Levski Burgas but the result was voided because the team who was won the match fielded the ineligible player, so the match was replayed in Sofia.

Semi-finals

|}

Final

References
Bulgaria - List of final tables (RSSSF)

Bulgarian State Football Championship seasons
1
1
Bul
Bul